Glenn Boland (born 4 July 1962) is a former Australian rules footballer who played with Melbourne and St Kilda in the Victorian Football League (VFL).

Notes

External links 
		
DemonWiki page

1962 births
Australian rules footballers from Victoria (Australia)
Melbourne Football Club players
St Kilda Football Club players
Living people